The 2018–19 North Carolina A&T Aggies men's basketball team represented North Carolina Agricultural and Technical State University during the 2018–19 NCAA Division I men's basketball season. The Aggies, led by third-year head coach Jay Joyner, played their home games at the Corbett Sports Center in Greensboro, North Carolina as members of the Mid-Eastern Athletic Conference.

Previous season
The Aggies finished the 2017–18 season  20–15, 11–5 in MEAC play to finish in a tie for fourth place. They defeated Delaware State and Norfolk State to advance to the semifinals of the MEAC tournament where they lost to Hampton. They were invited to the CollegeInsider.com Tournament where they lost in the first round to Liberty.

Roster

Schedule and results

|-
!colspan=9 style=| Non-conference regular season

|-
!colspan=9 style=| MEAC regular season

|-
!colspan=9 style=| MEAC tournament

|-

Source

References

North Carolina A&T Aggies men's basketball seasons
North Carolina AandT
North Carolina AandT Aggies men's basketball
North Carolina AandT Aggies men's basketball